The following list shows NCAA Division I football programs by winning percentage during the 1930–1939 football seasons. During this time the NCAA did not have any formal divisions. The following list reflects the records according to the NCAA. This list takes into account results modified later due to NCAA action, such as vacated victories and forfeits.

 Chart notes

 Holy Cross joined Division I in 1936.
 Hardin–Simmons joined Division I in 1939.
 Santa Clara joined Division I in 1932.
 St. Mary's joined Division I in 1930.
 Regis (CO) left Division I in 1930.
 Centenary (LA) joined Division I in 1930.
 George Washington joined Division I in 1932.
 Richmond joined Division I in 1933.
 Furman joined Division I in 1933.
 Manhattan joined Division I in 1936.
 Saint Louis joined Division I in 1932.
 Loyola Marymount joined Division I in 1933.
 Northern Colorado left Division I after the 1937 season.
 Washington & Jefferson left Division I after the 1934 season.
 San Francisco joined Division I in 1932.
 Colorado College left Division I after the 1937 season.
 Erskine joined Division I for the 1936 season.
 Northern Arizona joined Division I in 1931.
 Rhodes joined Division I for the 1939 season.
 Montana State left Division I after the 1937 season.
 Washburn joined Division I in 1935.
 Loyola (LA) joined Division I for the 1934–1936 seasons.
 Grinnell left Division I after the 1936 season.
 Chicago dropped football after the 1939 season.
 Presbyterian joined Division I during the 1935 & 1936 seasons
 Western State left Division I after the 1937 season.
 Colorado Mines left Division I after the 1937 season.

See also
 NCAA Division I FBS football win–loss records
 NCAA Division I football win–loss records in the 1920s
 NCAA Division I football win–loss records in the 1940s

References

Lists of college football team records